Copa Timor (English: Timor Cup) is the annual cup competition for amateur football teams in Timor Leste. This competition is managed by Federação de Futebol de Timor-Leste.

Teams

1995
Competition played in Sydney.
Sydney Temorense Uneted A
Sydney Temorense Uneted B
 Buffalo (Melbourne)
 Buldog (Melbourne)
 Brisbane
 Brother's Darwin

1997-98
Competition played in Perth.
Casuarina FC (new team)
 Darwin FC (new team)

Cup Winners
Darwin Brothers

2001-02
Competition played in Darwin.
East Timor Brothers United (new team)

2005
 Italiano Club Darwin (new team)

2012
Competition played in Dili.

2013-14
Competition started on 27 December 2013 and finished at the final match on 7 January 2014 in Dili. 8 team compete this season.

Timor A
Timor B (champions)
PNTL/F-FDTL
 Sydney
 Adelaide
 Darwin
 Melbourne
 Portugal

Champions

References

Football competitions in East Timor
1990s establishments in East Timor
Recurring sporting events established in 1995